Events from the year 1700 in Ireland.

Incumbent
Monarch: William III

Events

 December 28 – Laurence Hyde, 1st Earl of Rochester, appointed Lord Lieutenant of Ireland.

Arts and literature
c. March – the Yellow Book of Lecan is acquired by antiquary Edward Lhuyd.
An edition of the late 16th-century Scots poet Alexander Montgomerie's The Cherrie and the Slae is printed in Ulster.

Births

James Arbuckle, poet and critic (d. 1742)
Daniel O'Reilly, Roman Catholic Bishop of Clogher (d. 1778)
James Stopford, 1st Earl of Courtown, politician (d. 1770)
William O'Brien, 4th Earl of Inchiquin, peer and politician (d. 1777)

Deaths
Sir William Gore, 3rd Baronet.

References

 
Ireland
1700s in Ireland